Attapon Uea-aree (born 18 November 1989) is a Thai sport shooter.

He competed at the 2016 Summer Olympics in Rio de Janeiro, in the men's 50 metre rifle prone, where he qualified for the final and placed eighth.

References

External links

1989 births
Living people
Attapon Uea-aree
Attapon Uea-aree
Shooters at the 2016 Summer Olympics
Attapon Uea-aree
Southeast Asian Games medalists in shooting
Shooters at the 2010 Asian Games
Shooters at the 2014 Asian Games
Competitors at the 2007 Southeast Asian Games
Attapon Uea-aree
Attapon Uea-aree